Daejeon Polytechnic College is a vocational training college in the metropolitan city of Daejeon, South Korea.  The current president is Mun Gye-ok (문계옥).

Academics

The courses of study at the college are divided among seven departments:  
Multimedia, Mechatronics, 
Electrical Measurement and Control, 
Electronics, 
Computer-Aided Machinery, 
Computer-Aided Design, 
Computer-Aided Die and Mold, 
Automation of Industrial Installation.

Like most polytechnic colleges in the country, these courses strongly emphasize practical applications, through project-based practical learning.

History
The college was founded in 1994.

See also
Education in South Korea
List of colleges and universities in South Korea

External links
Official school website, in English and Korean

Vocational education in South Korea
Universities and colleges in Daejeon
Korea Polytechnics
Dong District, Daejeon
Educational institutions established in 1994
1994 establishments in South Korea

ko:한국폴리텍4대학